Inventing Anna is an American drama television miniseries created and produced by Shonda Rhimes, inspired by the story of Anna Sorokin and the article in New York titled "How Anna Delvey Tricked New York's Party People" by Jessica Pressler. The series was released on Netflix on February 11, 2022. Julia Garner starred as Anna Sorokin, the title character. The series received mixed reviews from critics, who praised the performances (particularly Garner) but criticized the inconsistent tone.

Premise
Under the assumed name Anna Delvey, Russian-born Anna Sorokin is able to con members of New York City's upper crust into believing she is a German heiress with access to a substantial fortune. She uses this persona to receive hundreds of thousands of dollars in cash, goods and services while working towards her goal of opening an exclusive art-themed club.

Cast and characters

Main

 Anna Chlumsky as Vivian Kent
 Julia Garner as Anna "Delvey" Sorokin
 Arian Moayed as Todd Spodek
 Katie Lowes as Rachel Williams
 Alexis Floyd as Neff Davis
 Anders Holm as Jack
 Anna Deavere Smith as Maud
 Jeff Perry as Lou
 Terry Kinney as Barry
 Laverne Cox as Kacy Duke

Recurring
 Rebecca Henderson as ADA Catherine McCaw
 Kate Burton as Nora Radford
 Tim Guinee as Paul
 Armand Schultz as Landon Bloom
 Anthony Edwards as Alan Reed

Guest
 Caitlin FitzGerald as Mags
 James Cusati-Moyer as Val
 Saamer Usmani as Chase Sikorski
 Marika Domińczyk as Talia Mallay
 Joshua Malina as Henrick Knight
 Christopher Lowell as Noah
 Ben Rappaport as Billy McFarland
 Will Stephen as Martin Shkreli
 Gemma McIlhenny as D.O.C. Officer 
 Kieron J. Anthony as Dr. Millikan
 Tracy Pollan as Sherry Reed

Episodes

Production
In June 2018, Netflix and Shondaland acquired the rights to the life story of Anna Sorokin and the New York article "How Anna Delvey Tricked New York's Party People" by Jessica Pressler, with plans to turn it into a television series with Shonda Rhimes serving as producer and writer, alongside Betsy Beers. Sorokin received $320,000, which was used to pay restitution and legal fees. David Frankel was named as director and executive producer of two episodes of the series, including the first.

In October 2019, Julia Garner, Anna Chlumsky, Katie Lowes, Laverne Cox, and Alexis Floyd joined the cast of the series. Madeline Brewer was set to portray the role of Anna Delvey but had to pass due to scheduling conflicts. Also in October 2019, principal photography began in New York and Los Angeles.

In November 2019, Arian Moayed, Anders Holm, Anna Deavere Smith, Jeff Perry and Terry Kinney joined the cast of the series. In February 2020, Jennifer Esposito joined the cast of the series, but never appeared and the part of Talia was played by Marika Dominczyk.

On February 11, 2022, Inventing Anna premiered on Netflix.

Reception

Reviews
On review aggregator website Rotten Tomatoes, the series holds a 64% approval rating based on 87 reviews, with an average rating of 6.2/10. The website's critics consensus reads, "While Inventing Anna is as tonally wobbly as Julia Garner's intentionally daffy accent, her committed performance and the salacious story make for juicy entertainment." On Metacritic, the series has a score of 57 out of 100, based on 34 reviews, indicating "mixed or average reviews".

Saloni Gajjar of The A.V. Club gave the limited series a B- and said, "Despite its more evocative performances, Inventing Anna demands patience that doesn't pay off, squandering its promising potential along the way." Reviewing the series for Rolling Stone, Alan Sepinwall gave a rating of 2/5 and described it as "an overly long muddle, never quite sure what it wants to say about its title character, or how to say it."

Mike Hale, television critic at the New York Times, praised some elements of the series and criticized others. Notably, he compared the original thrilling nature of the article to the slower pace of the television series: "Pressler's article was like a speeding car, a thrill ride that kept your pulse up right until it went off a cliff. Inventing Anna is a long, pokey road trip with no G.P.S. All of Pressler's most colorful anecdotes and appalling details have been squeezed in, sometimes tweaked to fit better within what is now a fictional narrative. But the thrill is gone."

Audience viewership
According to Samba TV, 1.6 million US households watched the Netflix series in its first 4 days of streaming.

The series sits in the all-time most watched English language TV series of all time with 511.92 million hours watched in the first 28 days of release, according to Netflix.

Accolades

References

External links
 
 

2020s American drama television miniseries
2022 American television series debuts
2022 American television series endings
English-language Netflix original programming
Fraud in television
Television series based on actual events
Television series by Shondaland
Television series created by Shonda Rhimes
Television series set in 2017
Television series set in 2018
Television series set in 2019
Television shows filmed in Los Angeles
Television shows filmed in New York City
Television shows set in New York City
Television shows set in Los Angeles
Television shows set in Germany
Television shows set in Morocco
Works based on periodical articles